John III, Lord of Arkel (c. 1275 - 24 December 1324) was Lord of Arkel from 1297 until his death in 1324.

Life 
He was the son of John II, Lord of Arkel and his wife, Bertha van Sterkenburg. He succeeded his father in 1297, after his father died at the battle of Vronen. 
John III expanded the Arkel lands further and bought lands in Holland and Brabant. He was a counsellor to the bishop of Utrecht, Guy of Avesnes. In 1304, he inherited the lands of Ter Leede as he was the only surviving heir of the Ter Leede lineage.

He was in favor of William I, Count of Hainaut and was appointed judge in 1321 to give a verdict about the differences between William I, Count of Hainaut and John I of Brabant. In later years John III lost his favor of William I, Count of Hainaut to the younger, Willem van Duivenvoorde.  Mogelijk is hij op de achtergrond gedrongen door Willem van Duivenvoorde. In that same year he named his eldest son, Sheriff of Ter Leede. In 1324, that son succeeded him as John IV, Lord of Arkel, previously known as Jan van der Lede. 
 
Jan is buried in Gorinchem, next to his first wife Mabelia of Voorne.

Marriage and Issue 
John married multiple times:

His first marriage in 1293, was to Mabelia of Voorne (c. 1273 - 26 February 1313), daughter of Albrecht of Voorne and Aleidis van Loon, with whom he had three children:

 John IV, Lord of Arkel (c. 1305 - 5 May 1360)
 Margaret, died young.
 Mabelia of Arkel (c. 1295 - 13 June 1368), married Gijsbrecht, Lord of Eem (also known as Eemkerk).

In 1310 had John had two illegitimate marriages and thus two illegitimate children:

 Jan de Gruyter (b. 1310) from an illegitimate marriage to lady de Gruyter.
 Dirk Alras van Arkel (b. 1315) from an illegitimate marriage to lady van Haestrecht.

In 1314, John married a second time, to Cunegonde of Virneburg (1295-1328). Their children were:

 John of Arkel, bishop of Utrecht and Liège, (1314-1378)
 Robrecht, Lord of den Berghe and Asperen, (1320-1347)
 Cunegonde of Arkel (1321-1346), married John, Lord of Heusden.

References 
 De vita et rebus gestis dom. de Arkel (ed. in Matthaei, Analecta V, 201 e.v.); Kronycke des lants van Arkel ende der steede van Gorkum (Kon. Bibl. hs.) (16e eeuw);
 Chronycke der heeren van Arkel ende oirspronck ende voortganck van de stede van Gorinchem (Kon. Bibl. hs.) (17e eeuw; door Aerent Kemp Jacobsz).
 J.C. Ramaer, Geographische Geschiedenis van Holland bezuiden de Lek en Nieuwe Maas in de Middeleeuwen (in Versl. Kon. Ac. afd. Lett. II, 3, 1899).

Lords of Arkel
1270s births
1324 deaths